Oecanthus is a genus of cricket in subfamily Oecanthinae, the tree crickets.

Species
The Orthoptera Species File lists:

Oecanthus adyeri
Oecanthus allardi
Oecanthus angustus
Oecanthus antennalis
Oecanthus argentinus
Oecanthus bilineatus
Oecanthus burmeisteri
Oecanthus californicus
Oecanthus capensis
Oecanthus celerinictus
Oecanthus chopardi
Oecanthus comma
Oecanthus comptulus
Oecanthus crucis
Oecanthus decorsei
Oecanthus dissimilis
Oecanthus dulcisonans
Oecanthus euryelytra
Oecanthus exclamationis
Oecanthus filiger
Oecanthus flavipes
Oecanthus forbesi
Oecanthus fultoni
Oecanthus galpini
Oecanthus henryi
Oecanthus immaculatus
Oecanthus indicus
Oecanthus jamaicensis
Oecanthus karschi
Oecanthus laricis
Oecanthus latipennis
Oecanthus leptogrammus
Oecanthus lineolatus
Oecanthus longicauda
Oecanthus macer
Oecanthus major
Oecanthus mhatreae
Oecanthus minutus
Oecanthus nanus
Oecanthus neofiliger
Oecanthus neosimilis
Oecanthus nigricornis
Oecanthus niveus
Oecanthus pellucens - type species (as "Acheta italica" Fabricius = O. pellucens pellucens)
Oecanthus peruvianus
Oecanthus pictipes
Oecanthus pini
Oecanthus prolatus
Oecanthus pseudosimilis
Oecanthus quadripunctatus
Oecanthus rectinervis
Oecanthus rileyi
Oecanthus rufescens
Oecanthus rufopictus
Oecanthus similator
Oecanthus similis
Oecanthus sinensis
Oecanthus socians
Oecanthus sycomorus
Oecanthus tenuis
Oecanthus turanicus
Oecanthus varicornis
Oecanthus zhengi

References

External links
 

 
Ensifera genera
Orthoptera of Africa
Orthoptera of Asia
Orthoptera of Europe
Orthoptera of North America
Orthoptera of South America
Taxa named by Jean Guillaume Audinet-Serville
Taxonomy articles created by Polbot